Metric time is the measure of time intervals using the metric system. The modern SI system defines the second as the base unit of time, and forms multiples and submultiples with metric prefixes such as kiloseconds and milliseconds. Other units of time – minute, hour, and day – are accepted for use with SI, but are not part of it. Metric time is a measure of time intervals, while decimal time is a means of recording time of day.

History
The second derives its name from the sexagesimal system, which originated with the Sumerians and Babylonians. This system divides a base unit into sixty minutes, each minute into sixty seconds, and each second into sixty tierces.  The word "minute" comes from the Latin pars minuta prima, meaning "first small part", and "second" from pars minuta secunda or "second small part".  Angular measure also uses sexagesimal units; there, it is the degree that is subdivided into minutes and seconds, while in time, it is the hour.

On March 28, 1794, the president of the French commission that developed the metric system, Joseph Louis Lagrange, proposed using the day (French jour) as the base unit of time, with divisions déci-jour and centi-jour. The final system, as introduced in 1795, included units for length, area, dry volume, liquid capacity, weight or mass, and currency, but not time. Decimal time of day had been introduced in France two years earlier, but was set aside at the same time the metric system was inaugurated, and did not follow the metric pattern of a base unit and prefixed units. 

Base units equivalent to decimal divisions of the day, such as 1/10, 1/100, 1/1,000, or 1/100,000 day, or other divisions of the day, such as 1/20 or 1/40 day, have also been proposed, with various names. Such alternative units did not gain any notable acceptance. The centiday (called kè in Chinese) was used in China for thousands of years. A centiday is about 14.4 minutes. In the 19th century, Joseph Charles François de Rey-Pailhade proposed using the centiday, abbreviated cé, divided into 10 decicés, 100 centicés, 1,000 millicés, and 10,000 dimicés.

James Clerk Maxwell and Elihu Thomson (through the British Association for the Advancement of Science, or BAAS) introduced the Centimetre gram second system of units in 1874 to derive electric and magnetic metric units, following the recommendation of Carl Friedrich Gauss in 1832.

In 1897, the Commission de décimalisation du temps was created by the French Bureau of Longitude, with the mathematician Henri Poincaré as secretary. The commission proposed making the standard hour the base unit of metric time, but the proposal did not gain acceptance and was eventually abandoned.

When the modern SI system was defined at the 10th General Conference on Weights and Measures (CGPM) in 1954, the ephemeris second (1/86400 of a mean solar day) was made one of the system's base units. Because the Earth's rotation is slowly decelerating at an irregular rate and was thus unsuitable as a reference point for precise measurements, the SI second was later redefined more precisely as the duration of 9,192,631,770 periods of the radiation corresponding to the transition between the two hyperfine levels of the ground state of the caesium-133 atom. The international standard atomic clocks use caesium-133 measurements as their main benchmark.

In computing
In computing, at least internally, metric time gained widespread use for ease of computation. Unix time gives date and time as the number of seconds since January 1, 1970, and Microsoft's NTFS FILETIME as multiples of 100 ns since January 1, 1601. VAX/VMS uses the number of 100 ns since November 17, 1858, and RISC OS the number of centiseconds since January 1, 1900. Microsoft Excel uses number of days (with decimals, floating point) since January 1, 1900.

All these systems present time for the user using traditional units. None of these systems is strictly linear, as they each have discontinuities at leap seconds.

Prefixes
Metric prefixes for subdivisions of a second are commonly used in science and technology. Milliseconds and microseconds are particularly common. Prefixes for multiples of a second are rarely used:

See also
 List of unusual units of measurement#Time, under which prefixed multiples of the second are included
 Soviet calendar

References

External links
 Metric unit of time (second) Official text of SI brochure from International Bureau of Weights and Measures
 Metric Time? University of Illinois Physics Department

International System of Units
Time measurement systems
Decimal time

de:Dezimalzeit